The Virgin, the Copts and Me is a 2011 documentary film directed by Namir Abdel Messeeh.

Synopsis
Namir is Egyptian, a Copt and now lives in France. When there is a family reunion, he buys an old video cassette recorded many years earlier at a religious holiday in his home village, when his mother said she had had a vision of the Blessed Virgin Mary. Namir realizes he has in his hands a very interesting subject for a documentary: he convinces his producer that it is a good idea and sets off on a journey that takes him back to his origins and puts his profession as a director to the test. However, he has not reckoned with his mother, the real protagonist of the story. Eventually, in her hometown, they recreate an apparition with the help of the other villagers.

Critical reception
Shown at the 2012 Tribeca Film Festival, the Festival Cinema Africano, the 2012 EBS International Documentary Festival, the 2012 Kraków Film Festival and at the 2012 Cannes Film Festival. It will be shown at the 2013 Sydney Film Festival.
Variety drew a parallel between the Coptic minority in Egypt and the Egyptian minority in France, and they commended the editing. For Slant Magazine, the staged apparition brings the film to a "satisfying climax". The Huffington Post commended the director's decision to keep the footage filmed in 2010, prior to the Egyptian Revolution of 2011. For America, the "Coptic population" is "held together by a shared sense of self-abnegation and unwavering faith" and it is "faith that remains a rallying force for the Copts on the screen" despite their "victimized status as a religious minority".

References

External links

Namir Abdel Messeeh's official blog

2011 films
Qatari documentary films
2011 documentary films
Egyptian documentary films
French documentary films
2010s French films